Alhassane Keita Otchico (born 26 June 1983), known as Keita, is a Guinean footballer who most recently played as a striker for American club Jacksonville Armada FC.

Club career
Keita was born in Conakry. After beginning his professional career in Morocco with Olympique Khouribga, he moved to Switzerland in 2001 joining FC Zürich; during his five-season stay he scored goals at an extraordinary rate, including 20 in 2005–06 as the club emerged champions and the player was crowned league top scorer.

Keita started the 2006–07 campaign still in Zürich, netting four in as many games, but signed with Saudi Arabian side Ittihad FC, in Jeddah. In late June 2008 he joined Spain's RCD Mallorca on a five-year link, being irregularly used in his first year – he did manage, however, to score twice as a second-half substitute in a 2–0 La Liga home win over Real Valladolid.

In July 2009, Keita was initially banned for four months after it was found out he signed with Umm-Salal Sports Club in Qatar after he had already committed to Mallorca. As the appeals begun, though, he was able to start the new season with the team, appearing in several matches from the bench; in late January 2010, the situation was resolved favorably to the Spaniards.

Keita was loaned to Valladolid in the second division, initially in a season-long move. However, in late January 2011, he cancelled his loan agreement, terminated his contract with Mallorca and joined Al-Shabab Riyadh from Saudi Arabia until 2013.

In August 2011, Keita left Saudi Arabia for Emirates Club in the UAE Arabian Gulf League, following a short spell. The same month in the following year, he moved to Dubai CSC.

In early January 2015, Keita moved clubs and countries again, signing with Jacksonville Armada FC from the North American Soccer League. He left two years later, as their all-time leading scorer.

In July 2017, Keita joined Prince Mohammad bin Salman League's Al-Watani. On 28 March of the following year, he returned to the Armada.

International career
Keita was part of the Guinean squad at the 2004 Africa Cup of Nations as they reached the competition's quarter-finals, with an exit against Mali. He did not play in the tournament, however.

Club statistics

Honours
FC Zürich
Swiss Cup: 2004–05
Super League/Nationalliga A: 2005–06

References

External links
Real Mallorca bio 

1983 births
Living people
Guinean Muslims
Guinean twins
Twin sportspeople
Sportspeople from Conakry
Guinean footballers
Association football forwards
Horoya AC players
Olympique Club de Khouribga players
FC Zürich players
Ittihad FC players
RCD Mallorca players
Real Valladolid players
Al-Shabab FC (Riyadh) players
Emirates Club players
Dubai CSC players
FC St. Gallen players
Al-Watani Club players
Jacksonville Armada FC players
Botola players
Swiss Super League players
Saudi Professional League players
La Liga players
Segunda División players
UAE Pro League players
North American Soccer League players
Guinea international footballers
2004 African Cup of Nations players
Guinean expatriate footballers
Guinean expatriate sportspeople in Morocco
Guinean expatriate sportspeople in Switzerland
Guinean expatriate sportspeople in Saudi Arabia
Guinean expatriate sportspeople in Spain
Guinean expatriate sportspeople in the United Arab Emirates
Guinean expatriate sportspeople in the United States
Expatriate footballers in Morocco
Expatriate footballers in Switzerland
Expatriate footballers in Saudi Arabia
Expatriate footballers in Spain
Expatriate footballers in the United Arab Emirates
Expatriate soccer players in the United States